State Route 267 (SR 267) is a  state highway in Nevada, United States.  Known as Scotty's Castle Road, the highway connects Death Valley National Park to U.S. Route 95.  The route was previously designated State Route 72.

Route description

SR 267 is a continuation of Scotty's Castle Road within Death Valley National Park. The route begins just east of Scotty's Castle, at the California–Nevada state line in Esmeralda County. The highway travels northeast from there, entering Nye County as it traverses the desert.

History

Scotty's Castle Road first appears as an unimproved County road in 1932 edition of the state highway map, connecting State Route 5 (now US 95) to Death Valley via the town of Bonnie Claire. The road was designated State Route 72 by 1942, and had been paved by 1952.

State Route 267 was assigned to former SR 72 on July 1, 1976. This change first appeared on official state maps in 1978.

Major intersections
Note: Mileposts in Nevada reset at county lines; the start and end mileposts for each county are given in the county column.

See also

References

267
Transportation in Esmeralda County, Nevada
Transportation in Nye County, Nevada